Muhammad Rafiq Ismail (born 24 March 1997, Selangor, Malaysia) is a Malaysian ten-pin bowler.

Career
Ismail bowls left handed with a 16lb ball. In 2018, he became the first Malaysian to win the singles final of the Men's World Tenpin Bowling Championships.

Honours
 European Bowling Tour: 2019 EBT Masters
 WTBA World Tenpin Bowling Championships Men Singles: 2018
 National Sportsman Award: 2018

References

1997 births
Living people
Malaysian ten-pin bowling players
Asian Games medalists in bowling
Bowlers at the 2014 Asian Games
Bowlers at the 2018 Asian Games
Asian Games gold medalists for Malaysia
Asian Games silver medalists for Malaysia
Medalists at the 2014 Asian Games
Medalists at the 2018 Asian Games
Citizens of Malaysia through descent
Southeast Asian Games gold medalists for Malaysia
Southeast Asian Games silver medalists for Malaysia
Southeast Asian Games bronze medalists for Malaysia
Southeast Asian Games medalists in bowling
Competitors at the 2015 Southeast Asian Games
Competitors at the 2017 Southeast Asian Games
Competitors at the 2019 Southeast Asian Games
People from Selangor
21st-century Malaysian people